Pat Matson (born July 22, 1944) was an American Football League and National Football League offensive lineman from 1966 through 1975.

See also
Other American Football League players

1944 births
Living people
American football offensive linemen
Oregon Ducks football players
Denver Broncos (AFL) players
Cincinnati Bengals players
Green Bay Packers players
People from Laramie, Wyoming
Players of American football from Wyoming
American Football League players